
Lake Coffy is a lake between Bettens and Boussens in the canton of Vaud, Switzerland. It surface area is 1.2 ha. The artificial lake was created in 1972. The site is listed in the Federal Inventory of Amphibian Spawning Areas.

Coffy
Coffy
Protected areas of Switzerland